Up New Generation is a new version of the Up Series, following the lives of a group of individuals who were seven years old at the turn of the millennium.

The series is directed by Julian Farino and began with 7Up 2000, first broadcast in April 2000. The second instalment, 14 Up 2000, aired in two parts on BBC One in September 2007.

21 Up New Generation was broadcast in September 2014 in two parts, while 28 Up was broadcast on BBC One from 29 September 2021 with the new subtitle Millennium Generation. Also in 2021, the five previous programmes were added to the BBC iPlayer for viewers of the new episodes to watch.

28 Up: Millennial Generation
28 Up: Millennial Generation is a two-part documentary made by ITV for the BBC via their factual programming division Multistory Media, the company behind Michael Apted's 63 Up from 2019. Both episodes are 60 minutes in length, with the first episode featuring five participants from the original 2000 documentary.

Episode one went out on BBC One at 9pm on 29 September 2021 and featured Oliver, Ben from Mull, Gemma, BMX biker John and radio DJ Sanchez. Episode two is due to be broadcast by the BBC at 9pm on 6 October 2021 and will feature Ryan from Bolton, songwriter Orala, Talan from Cornwall and Stacey, who has been teaching in China for eight-years.

List of films and premiere dates

Participation record

References

External links
 
 

British documentary films
British television documentaries
Documentary films about children
Biographical documentary films
Films directed by Julian Farino
2000s British films